Saïdou Bokoum (born 1945) is a Guinean writer. Born in Dinguiraye, in 1974 he published Chaîne, a novel about the plight of Africans living in France. He has published several works related to theatre.

References

Guinean novelists
Male novelists
Guinean male writers
1945 births
Living people
People from Dinguiraye
20th-century novelists
20th-century male writers